Global Star Software was a Canadian video game publisher based in Mississauga. It was founded in 1995 by Craig McGauley and Damian Cristiani and operated alongside their Triad Distributors, which had been founded in 1993. Both companies were acquired by Take-Two Interactive on 1 September 1999. When the "2K Play" label was added to Take-Two's 2K label on 10 September 2007, 2K absorbed all of Global Star's assets.

List of games

References 

1995 establishments in Ontario
1999 mergers and acquisitions
2007 disestablishments in Ontario
2007 mergers and acquisitions
Take-Two Interactive divisions and subsidiaries
Video game companies established in 1995
Video game companies disestablished in 2007
Defunct video game companies of Canada
Video game publishers